Demirözü is a town in Bayburt Province in the Black Sea region of Turkey. It is the seat of Demirözü District. Its population is 3,771 (2021). The mayor is Arslan Gürer (AKP).

References

Populated places in Bayburt Province
Towns in Turkey
Demirözü District